Boxing Hall of Fame could refer to:
 International Boxing Hall of Fame (IBHOF), located in Canastota, New York
 The Ring magazine Hall of Fame, located at Madison Square Garden, New York City

See also
Hall of Fame